The 2005 Southern Illinois Salukis football team represented Southern Illinois University as a member of the Gateway Football Conference during the 2005 NCAA Division I-AA football season. They were led by fifth-year head coach Jerry Kill and played their home games at McAndrew Stadium in Carbondale, Illinois. The Salukis finished the season with a 9–4 record overall and a 5–2 record in conference play, making them conference co-champions. The team received an at-large bid to the Division I-AA playoffs, where they defeated Eastern Illinois before losing to Appalachian State in the quarterfinals. Southern Illinois was ranked No. 7 in The Sports Network's postseason ranking of FCS teams.

Schedule

References

Southern Illinois
Southern Illinois Salukis football seasons
Missouri Valley Football Conference champion seasons
Southern Illinois Salukis football